Mustafa Hamed Mohamed (October 17, 1959 in Melilla, Spain), better known as Mustafa Aberchán after his Riffian clan name, is a Spanish politician from Melilla. He is the leader of the political organization Coalition for Melilla.

He was the Mayor-President of the city from July 5, 1999, to July 19, 2000, with backing from the Spanish Socialist Workers' Party and the Independent Liberal Group, which made him the first Muslim to hold this position.

References

1959 births
Living people
Mayor-Presidents of Melilla
Members of the Assembly of Melilla
Coalition for Melilla politicians
Spanish people of Moroccan-Berber descent
Spanish Berber politicians
Spanish Muslims
People from Melilla